Stadion Miejski Hutnika (Kraków) (in English: Hutnik Kraków City Stadium), also known as the Stadion Suche Stawy Polish pronunciation: (in English: Suche Stawy Stadium), is a multi-purpose stadium in Kraków, Poland.  It is mainly used mostly for football matches and hosts the home matches of Hutnik Kraków.  The stadium has a capacity of 6,500 spectators. It was used by England as a training base for the Euro 2012.

References

Football venues in Poland
Multi-purpose stadiums in Poland
Sport in Kraków
Buildings and structures in Kraków
Sports venues in Lesser Poland Voivodeship